Spilarctia tigrina is a moth in the family Erebidae. It was described by Frederic Moore in 1879. It is found in southern India.

References

Moths described in 1879
tigrina